Yalal is a village in Yalal Mandal in Vikarabad District in the state of Telangana in India.

References

External links
Ranga Reddy official website

Mandals in Vikarabad district